The R437 road is a regional road in Ireland which runs northwest-southeast from the N62 near Ferbane, County Offaly to the N52 in Kilcormac, County Offaly.

See also
Roads in Ireland
National primary road
National secondary road

References
Roads Act 1993 (Classification of Regional Roads) Order 2006 – Department of Transport

Regional roads in the Republic of Ireland
Roads in County Offaly